Bodner is a surname. Notable people with the surname include:

Joseph Bodner (1925–1982), American painter
Keith Bodner (born 1967), Canadian scholar
Yisroel Pinchos Bodner, author of several books on Jewish Law

Jewish surnames
Occupational surnames